Martita Edith Hunt (30 January 190013 June 1969) was an Argentine-born British theatre and film actress. She had a dominant stage presence and played a wide range of powerful characters. She is best remembered for her performance as Miss Havisham in David Lean's Great Expectations.

Biography

Early life
Hunt was born in Buenos Aires on 30 January 1900 to English parents Alfred and Marta (née Burnett) Hunt. She spent the first 20 years of her life in Argentina  before she travelled with her parents to the United Kingdom to attend Queenwood Ladies' College in Eastbourne and then to train as an actress.

Early theatrical career
Hunt began her acting career in repertory theatre at Liverpool before moving to London. She first appeared there in the Stage Society's production of Ernst Toller's The Machine Wreckers at the Kingsway Theatre in May 1923. From 1923 to 1929, she appeared as the Principessa della Cercola in W. Somerset Maugham's Our Betters (Globe, 1924) and as Mrs. Linde in Ibsen's A Doll's House (Playhouse, 1925) in the West End, along with engagements at club theatres such as the Q Theatre and the Arts Theatre and a short 1926 Chekhov season at the small Barnes Theatre under Theodore Komisarjevsky (playing Charlotta Ivanovna, in The Cherry Orchard and Olga in Three Sisters). 

In September 1929, she joined the Old Vic company, then led by Harcourt Williams, and, during the following eight months played Béline in Molière's The Imaginary Invalid, Queen Elizabeth in George Bernard Shaw's The Dark Lady of the Sonnets, and Lavinia in Shaw's Androcles and the Lion. However, her time there was more noted for a succession of Shakespearean roles: the Nurse in Romeo and Juliet, Portia in The Merchant of Venice, the Queen in Richard II, Helena in A Midsummer Night's Dream, Portia in Julius Caesar), including roles with John Gielgud (Rosalind in As You Like It, Lady Macbeth in Macbeth, and Gertrude in Hamlet).

In Hunt's entry in the Oxford Dictionary of National Biography, Donald Roy wrote:"With an arresting appearance and a dominant stage presence, she proved most effective as strong, tragic characters, her Gertrude in Hamlet being accounted by some critics the finest they had seen."

She then returned to the West End (briefly returning to the Old Vic to play Emilia in the 1938 Othello), notably playing Edith Gunter in Dodie Smith's Autumn Crocus (Lyric, 1931), the Countess of Rousillon in All's Well That Ends Well (Arts, 1932), Lady Strawholme in Ivor Novello's Fresh Fields (Criterion, 1933), Liz Frobisher in John Van Druten's The Distaff Side (Apollo, 1933), Barbara Dawe in Clemence Dane's Moonlight Is Silver (Queen's, 1934), Theodora in Elmer Rice's Not for Children (Fortune, 1935), Masha in Chekhov's The Seagull (New Theatre, 1936), the Mother in an English-language version of García Lorca's Bodas de sangre ("Marriage of Blood"; Savoy, 1939), Léonie in Jean Cocteau's Les Parents Terribles (Gate, 1940), Mrs Cheveley in Oscar Wilde's An Ideal Husband (Westminster, 1943), and Cornelia in John Webster's The White Devil (Duchess, 1947).

Early film career
Hunt also appeared in many supporting roles in several popular British films such as Good Morning, Boys (1937), Trouble Brewing (1939), and The Man in Grey (1943). The Wicked Lady (1945) was an international success, but her next film role in David Lean's Great Expectations (1946) would be her most famous and most lauded. As Miss Havisham, she reprised her role from the 1939 stage adaptation by Alec Guinness which provided the inspiration and template for Lean's film. Her performance met with significant acclaim, and Roger Ebert later wrote in 1999 that she "dominate[d] the [film's] early scenes, playing Miss Havisham as a beak-nosed, shabby figure, bedecked in crumbling lace and linen, not undernourished despite her long exile."

Later career
Martita  Hunt acted in The Sleeping Prince in 1953 at the Phoenix  Theatre. From this time on, she divided her time between British and American films as well as the stage. She won a Tony Award in 1949 for her Broadway début as Countess Aurelia in the English-speaking première of Giraudoux's The Madwoman of Chaillot (though she had relatively less impact on the production's 1952 tour). Her last stage role was as Angélique Boniface in Hotel Paradiso, an adaptation from Feydeau, again with Guinness at the Winter Garden Theatre in May 1956.

Other films in which she appeared include: Anna Karenina (1948), The Fan (1949), Anastasia (1956), Three Men in a Boat (1956), The Admirable Crichton (1957), The Brides of Dracula (1960), The Wonderful World of the Brothers Grimm (1962), Becket (1964), The Unsinkable Molly Brown (1964) and Bunny Lake Is Missing (1965). She also appeared on TV as Lady Bastable in several adaptations of the Saki stories (1962)

Death
Martita Hunt died of bronchial asthma at her home in Hampstead, London, aged 69, on 13 June 1969. Her estate was valued at £5,390. She never married. 

She was cremated at Golders Green Crematorium on 19 June and her ashes lie in the Ivor Novello Rose Bed.

Selected filmography

 A Rank Outsider (1920)
 Service for Ladies (1932) as Aline – Countess Ricardi's Maid (uncredited)
 Love on Wheels (1932) as Piano Demonstrator
 I Was a Spy (1933) as Aunt Lucille
 Friday the Thirteenth (1933) as Agnes Lightfoot
 Too Many Millions (1934) as Mrs. Pilcher
 Mr. What's-His-Name? (1935) as Mrs. Davies
 The Case of Gabriel Perry (1935) as Mrs. Read
 Man of the Moment (1935) as Roulette Player
 First a Girl (1935) as Seraphina
 King Of The Damned (1935) as Woman on Plane (uncredited)
 When Knights Were Bold (1936) as Aunt Esther
 Pot Luck (1936) as Mrs. Cream
 Tudor Rose (1936) as Jane's Mother
 The Interrupted Honeymoon (1936) as Nora Briggs
 The Beloved Vagabond (1936) as Lady with lorgnettes (uncredited)
 Sabotage (1936) as Miss Chatham – The Professor's Daughter (uncredited)
 The Mill on the Floss (1936) as Mrs. Glegg
 Good Morning, Boys (1937) as Lady Bogshott
 Farewell Again (1937) as Adela Swayle
 Paradise for Two (1937) as Mme. Bernard (uncredited)
 Second Best Bed (1938) as Mrs. Mather
 Strange Boarders (1938) as Miss Pitter
 Prison Without Bars (1938) as Mme. Appel
 Everything Happens to Me (1938)
 Trouble Brewing (1939) as Madame Berdi
 The Nursemaid Who Disappeared (1939) as Lady Alice Ballister
 A Girl Must Live (1939) as Mme. Dupont, assistant
 Goodbye, Mr. Chips (1939) as British Tourist on Bicycle (uncredited)
 Young Man's Fancy (1939) as Duchess of Beaumont
 Old Mother Riley Joins Up (1939) as Commandant
 At the Villa Rose (1940) as Helen Vaquier
 The Middle Watch (1940) as Lady Elizabeth Hewett
 The Good Old Days (1940) as Sara Macaulay
 Tilly of Bloomsbury (1940) as Lady Marion Mainwaring
 Freedom Radio (1941) as Frau Lehmann the Concierge
 Quiet Wedding (1941) as Mme. Mirelle
 East of Piccadilly (1941) as Ma
 The Seventh Survivor (1942) as Mrs. Lindley
 They Flew Alone (1942) as Miss Bland
 Lady from Lisbon (1942) as Susan Wellington-Smythe
 Sabotage at Sea (1942) as Daphne Faber
 Talk about Jacqueline (1942) as Colonel's Wife (uncredited)
 The Importance of being earnest (1943) as Lady Bracknell 
 The Man in Grey (1943) as Miss Patchett
 Welcome, Mr. Washington (1944) as Miss Finch
 The Wicked Lady (1945) as Cousin Agatha
 Great Expectations (1946) as Miss Havisham
 The Ghosts of Berkeley Square (1947) as Lady Mary
 The Little Ballerina (1947) as Miss Crichton
 Anna Karenina (1948) as Princess Betty Tversky
 So Evil My Love (1948) as Mrs. Courtney
 My Sister and I (1948) as Mrs. Camelot
 The Fan (1949) as Duchess of Berwick
 The Story of Robin Hood and His Merrie Men (1952) as Queen Eleanor
 Treasure Hunt (1952) as Aunt Anna Rose
 Meet Me Tonight (1952) as Mabel Grace: Red Peppers
 It Started in Paradise (1952) as Mme. Alice
 Folly to Be Wise (1953) as Lady Dodd
 Melba (1955) as Mme. Marchesi
 King's Rhapsody (1955) as Queen Mother
 The March Hare (1956) as Lady Anne
 Anastasia (1956) as Baroness Elena von Livenbaum
 Three Men in a Boat (1956) as Mrs. Willis
 The Admirable Crichton (1957) as Lady Brocklehurst
 Les Espions (1957) as Connie Harper
 Dangerous Exile (1957) as Lady Lydia Fell
 Bonjour tristesse (1958) as Philippe's Mother
 Me and the Colonel (1958) as Mother Superior
 La prima notte (1959) as Lisa Bradwell
 Bottoms Up (1960) as Lady Gore-Willoughby
 The Brides of Dracula (1960) as Baroness Meinster
 Song Without End (1960) as Grand Duchess
 Mr. Topaze (1961) as Baroness
 The Wonderful World of the Brothers Grimm (1962) as Anna Richter (Story Teller)
 Becket (1964) as Empress Matilda
 The Unsinkable Molly Brown (1964) as Grand Duchess Elise Lupavinova
 Bunny Lake Is Missing (1965) as Ada Ford
 The Best House in London (1969) as Headmistress (final film role)

References

Sources
 Who Was Who in the Theatre, 1912–1976, 2 (1978), pp. 1241–2
 W. Rigdon, The Biographical Encyclopedia (1966), p. 556
 D. Quinlan, The Illustrated Directory of Film Character Actors (1985), p. 152
 S. D'Amico, ed., Enciclopedia dello spettacolo, 11 vols. (Rome, 1954–68)
 P. Hartnoll, ed., The Concise Oxford Companion to the Theatre (1972), p. 259
 The Times (14 June 1969), pp. 1, 10
 J. Willis, ed., Theatre World, 26 (1970), pp. 268–9
 F. Gaye, ed., Who's Who in the Theatre, 14th edn (1967), pp. 769–70
 E. M. Truitt, Who Was Who on Screen, 3rd edn (1983), 360
 The Guardian (14 June 1969), p. 5
 R. May, A Companion to the Theatre (1973), p. 110
 J.-L. Passek, ed., Dictionnaire du cinéma (1991), p. 334

External links

 
 
 Donald Roy profile of Martita Hunt, Oxford Dictionary of National Biography
 
 Martita Hunt Collection is held by the Victoria and Albert Museum Theatre and Performance DepartmentReference Number(s):	THM/132/3Dates of Creation c. 1910s – 1960sPhysical Description: 11 folders.

1900 births
1969 deaths
Argentine people of English descent
Donaldson Award winners
English film actresses
English stage actresses
English television actresses
People from Hampstead
English Shakespearean actresses
Tony Award winners
Deaths from asthma
People educated at Queenwood Ladies' College
Actresses from Buenos Aires
20th-century English actresses
British expatriates in Argentina
British expatriates in the United States